Io (minor planet designation: 85 Io is carbonaceous asteroid from the central region of the asteroid belt, approximately 170 kilometers in diameter. It is an identified Eunomian interloper.

Discovery and naming 

It was discovered by C. H. F. Peters on 19 September 1865, and named after Io, a lover of Zeus in Greek mythology. Io is also the name of the volcanic satellite of Jupiter. With a two-digit number and a two-letter name, 85 Io has the shortest designation of all minor planets.

Orbit and physical characteristics 

Io is a retrograde rotator, with its pole pointing towards one of ecliptic coordinates (β, λ) = (-45°, 105°) or (-15°, 295°) with a 10° uncertainty. This gives an axial tilt of about 125° or 115°, respectively. Its shape is quite regular.

In the SMASS classification, Io is a carbonaceous C-type asteroid, which means that it is probably a primitive body composed of carbonates. Like 141 Lumen it is an interloper that orbits within the Eunomia asteroid family but it is not related to the shattered parent body.

An Ionian diameter of 178 kilometres was measured from an occultation of a star on 10 December 1995. Another asteroid occultation of Io (magnitude 13.2) occurred on 12 March 2009, from the eastern United States, with the star 2UCAC 35694429
(magnitude 13.8).

See also 
 List of Solar System objects by size

References

External links 
Shapes and rotational properties of thirty asteroids from photometric data, Torppa (2003) 
 
 

000085
Discoveries by Christian Peters
Named minor planets
000085
000085
000085
18650919